Holothrips notialis is a species of thrips in the Phlaeothripinae subfamily, first described in 2014 by Laurence Mound and Desley Tree. This thrips is found in the Australian Capital Territory, New South Wales, South Australia, Tasmania, and Victoria, and is endemic to Australia.

This thrips, like others of its genus, is fungus feeding and not usually found in large colonies.

References

Phlaeothripidae
Thrips
Taxa named by Laurence Alfred Mound
Insects described in 2014